The skōlex (Indus worm or the horrible Indian worm), in ancient Greek writings, was a supposed giant, white, carnivorous worm with a large pair of teeth that lived in the Indus River.

Etymology
Gustav Oppert in the 19th century reasoned that skōlex referred to a like-sounding word in the Indian language, and was convinced the word was culukī for "fish" or "porpoise". In his opinion, the word could refer  even to a "crocodile" by extension. Scholar Erik Seldeslachts, in a 1998 paper, has suggested parallel with kṛmiḥ which has the dual meaning of "worm" and a name of a nāgarāja or "serpent king".

Description
Ctesias's Indica described the worm or skōlex as the only creature to inhabit the Indus. It resembled the worm which infested figs, but averaged 7 cubits (10 ft) in length. It had a pair of large teeth, one on the upper jaw and one on the lower. The teeth were square, measuring 1 pygōn in the Ancient Greek scale of length, about 15 inches long. It burrowed in the mud bottom by day, and nocturnally devoured prey such as horses, cows, donkeys or camels. Philostratus, reporting on the creature of the same river system, said it resembled a white worm, alluding to its color.

The worm was reputedly hunted with bait, and a volatile inflammable oil was collected from it. This oil was used in warfare by Indian kings; cities were set ablaze with the oil-filled sealed pots, thrown like grenades. This "skolex oil" may have actually been petroleum or naphtha, and not derived from an animal at all. Although, assuming the skolex referred to some crocodilian, oil could be extracted from this reptile. It is known that fish oils or the Ganges dolphin oil have been exploited in India, although not for incendiary purpose.

The worm may have given rise to the legend of the horned creature odontotyrannus of the Ganges, reported to have attacked Alexander the Great's troops.

See also
Mongolian death worm

Explanatory notes

References

Citations

Bibliography

Greek legendary creatures
Legendary worms